Judge Roy Bean was a syndicated western television series based very loosely on the life of a Texas justice of the peace. Edgar Buchanan played Roy Bean, known as "the only law west of the Pecos." The series was originally broadcast during the 1955 television season.

The series was set in Langtry, Texas, and starred Buchanan as Judge Roy Bean, Jackie Loughery as his niece Letty Bean, and Jack Buetel as Jeff Taggert, Bean's deputy. Russell Hayden had a recurring role as Steve, a Texas Ranger. Hayden was also the series’ producer. Guest stars included Tris Coffin, Myron Healey, X Brands, Glenn Strange and Lash LaRue.

The self-appointed Judge Bean held court in his combination general store and saloon and often assigned Jeff Taggert to investigate crimes. Bean was an admirer of actress Lillie Langtry, and claimed that the town of Langtry was named in her honor, though the Southern Pacific Railroad had given the town the name of one of their dignitaries.

There were 39 half-hour episodes, shot in color in Pioneertown, California. In the mid-1950s most television stations only broadcast black-and-white programing, and during the series' original run only five stations aired Judge Roy Bean episodes in color. The remaining stations showed the syndicated series in black-and-white.

Episodes

Reception
Joseph Landau of the Louisville, Kentucky The Courier-Journal stated that "the only similarity between Judge Roy Bean of television and the real Roy Bean is the TV boys got the name right."

References 

First-run syndicated television programs in the United States
1950s Western (genre) television series